Hamza Essalih (born May 29, 1992, in Amesterdam,  Netherlands), is a Dutch-Moroccan kickboxer. As of May 2019 he was the #10 ranked Bantamweight in the world by Combat Press.

Biography and career
Hamza Essalih grew up in his hometown in Amsterdam, in the De Pijp district. Coming from a Moroccan family of eight children, he is interested in football and kickboxing which he practices outside in the neighborhood with his friends. His father worked at the time in a factory. Having started karate at the age of ten, he very quickly changed his combat sport by focusing on kickboxing. He was quickly registered by his father in a kickboxing room in the neighborhood. When Hamza was eleven, his father stopped working because of cancer. Meanwhile, Hamza Essalih is finishing high school and studying administration. When he was fourteen, he found himself in several problems with the justice system for thefts and carjackings.

On June 25, 2016, he lost his third fight in the GLORY organization during the edition 31 in Amsterdam. In total, he fights 61 times under GLORY.

In 2017, he signed his first professional contract with Enfusion under the training of Mosab Amrani.

In 2006, he received the role of actor in the Dutch feature film Langer Licht released in 2006. Hamza Essalih has only one MMA fight, which resulted in a loss.

Personal life 
He is the brother of Omar Essalih, one of the figures of the Mocro Maffia. He strongly condemns and completely detaches himself from his brother's acts before the latter is shot on the evening of May 2, 2020 in Amsterdam.

Titles and achievements

 2016: Champion of the Netherlands
 2017: Champion of the Netherlands
 2019: IPCC World Champion

Kickboxing record

|-  bgcolor="#fbb"
| 2022-09-24 || Loss ||align=left| Deniz Demirkapu || Enfusion 112 || Eindhoven, Netherlands || KO (Punches) ||  1||3:00 
|-
! style=background:white colspan=9 |
|-  bgcolor="#fbb"
| 2019-11-02 || Loss||align=left| Soufiane Kaddouri || Enfusion 90 || Antwerp, Belgium || TKO (Doctor Stoppage) || 3 ||  2:52
|-
! style=background:white colspan=9 |
|-  bgcolor="#cfc"
| 2019-05-04 || Win||align=left| Andrej Bruhl || Enfusion 84 || Darmstadt, Germany || Decision || 3 || 3:00
|-
! style=background:white colspan=9 |
|-  bgcolor="#fbb"
| 2019-06-29|| Loss||align=left| Jia Aoqi || Wu Lin Feng 2019: WLF -67kg World Cup 2019-2020 1st Group Stage || Zhengzhou, China || TKO (Doctor Stoppage) || 2 || 0:17
|-  bgcolor="#cfc"
| 2019-02-23 || Win||align=left| Lofogo Sarour || Enfusion 78 || Eindhoven, Netherlands || Decision || 3 || 3:00
|-  style="background:#fbb;"
| 2019-01-02 || Loss || align=left| Wang Pengfei || Wu Lin Feng 2019: WLF -65kg World Championship Tournament Quarter Finals|| Hengqin, China || Ext.R Decision || 4 || 3:00
|-  bgcolor="#cfc"
| 2018-10-27 || Win||align=left| Eddy Nait Slimani || Enfusion Talents #60 || Oberhausen, Germany  || Ext.R Decision  || 4 ||  3:00
|-  bgcolor="#cfc"
| 2018-05-12 || Win||align=left| Damencio Patty || Enfusion Talents #52 || The Hague, Netherlands || Decision  || 3 ||  3:00
|-  bgcolor="#cfc"
| 2017-11-11 || Win||align=left| Islem Hamech || Enfusion Talents #40 || Amsterdam, Netherlands || Decision  || 3 ||  3:00
|-  bgcolor="#fbb"
| 2017-09-30 || Loss||align=left| Soufiane Kaddouri || Enfusion Talents #37 || Antwerp, Belgium || Ext.R Decision  || 4 ||  3:00
|-  bgcolor="#cfc"
| 2017-03-24 || Win||align=left| Ayoub Ahmamou || Enfusion Talents #30 || Abu Dhabi || TKO (Docto Stoppage)  || 2 ||
|-  bgcolor="#cfc"
| 2016-09-17 || Win||align=left| Nafi Bilalovski || Enfusion Live || Antwerp, Belgium ||  Decision (Unanimous) || 3 ||  3:00
|-  style="background:#fbb;"
| 2016-06-25 || Loss ||align=left| Paul Jansen || Glory 31: Amsterdam, Prelims || Amsterdam, Netherlands || Decision (Unanimous) || 3 || 3:00
|-  bgcolor="#fbb"
| 2016-05-20 || Loss||align=left| Mohammed Didouh || Enfusion Fighting Rookies|| Amsterdam, Netherlands ||  Decision  || 3 ||  3:00
|-  bgcolor="#cfc"
| 2015-12-04 || Win ||align=left| Redouane Boukerch || Glory 26: Amsterdam, Prelims || Amsterdam, Netherlands || Decision (Unanimous) || 3 || 3:00
|- style="background:#fbb;"
| 2015-08-08|| Loss||align=left| Saenchai || Fight League || Morocco || Decision || 5 || 3:00
|-  bgcolor=#cfc
| 2015-05-24 || Win||align=left| Massaro Glunder || Enfusion Kickboxing Talents || Amsterdam, Netherlands || Ext.R Decision|| 4 || 3:00
|-  bgcolor=#cfc
| 2015-03-07 || Win||align=left| Wilson Mendes|| Fight League - The Beginning || Hoofddorp, Netherlands ||  Decision|| 3 || 3:00
|-  bgcolor=#c5d2ea
| 2014-09-27 || Draw||align=left| Cristian Spetcu || SUPERKOMBAT World Grand Prix IV 2014 || Almere, Netherlands || Ext.R Decision|| 4 || 3:00
|-  bgcolor=#cfc
| 2014-01-25 || Win||align=left| Sergio Wielzen || Enfusion Fighting Rookies || Antwerp, Belgium || Ext.R Decision|| 4 || 3:00
|-  bgcolor=#cfc
| 2013-09-17 || Win||align=left| Maykol Yurk || Fight Fans || Netherlands || Decision|| 3 || 3:00
|-  bgcolor=#cfc
| 2013-05-26 || Win||align=left| Danny Moi Thuk Shung || Enfusion Fighting Rookies || Amsterdam, Netherlands || Decision|| 5 || 3:00
|-  bgcolor="#c5d2ea"
| 2013-03-16 || Draw ||align=left| Javier Hernandez || El Desafio k1|| Málaga, Spain || Decision || 3 || 3:00
|-  bgcolor="#fbb"
| 2013-01-26 || Loss ||align=left| Eddy Nait Slimani || Stars Night || Vitrolles, France || Decision  || 3 ||  3:00
|-  style="background:#cfc;"
| 2012-12-01 || Win || align=left|  Idris Demirci || Zaansation 2 || Netherlands || KO (Flying Knee) || 3 ||
|-  style="background:#fbb;"
| 2011-07-23 || Loss || align=left| Kosuke Komiyama || RISE 80 || Tokyo, Japan || Decision (Majority) || 3 || 3:00
|-
| colspan=9 | Legend:

References
From French Wikipedia

External links

 Hamza Essalih in globalfightcenter.com

Living people
Moroccan male kickboxers
Dutch male kickboxers
Glory kickboxers
1992 births
Lightweight kickboxers